Tilley is a hamlet in southern Alberta, Canada within the County of Newell. It is located approximately 22 km southeast of the City of Brooks and 78 km northwest of the City of Medicine Hat.

History 
Founded in 1910 during the construction of the Canadian Pacific Railway main line, Tilley was incorporated as a village on May 9, 1940. It dissolved from village status on August 31, 2013 to become a hamlet under the jurisdiction of the County of Newell.

Demographics 

The population of Tilley according to the 2020 municipal census conducted by the County of Newell is 335, a decrease from its 2007 municipal census population count of  405.

Economy 
Tilley's main industries are agriculture (irrigated crop farming and livestock operations) and petroleum.

Attractions 
Amenities within Tilley include an arena, a curling rink, a community hall, and three parks.

Education 
Tilley Public School, operated by Grasslands Public Schools, serves students in kindergarten through grade 9.

See also 
List of communities in Alberta
List of former urban municipalities in Alberta
List of hamlets in Alberta

References 

2013 disestablishments in Alberta
Populated places disestablished in 2013
County of Newell
Designated places in Alberta
Former villages in Alberta
Hamlets in Alberta